Funnel Cloud is the fourth album by folk rock band Hem.  It was released on Nettwerk on September 5, 2006. Considered the band's most ambitious work to date, they recorded the album accompanied by a 21-piece orchestra, as well as James Iha of the Smashing Pumpkins.

The concept was conceived on the day of lead singer Sally Ellyson's Virginia wedding, during which the party had to evacuate to storm cellars due to a number of tornadoes that touched down in the area.

Track listing
All songs written by Dan Messé, except where noted.
 We'll Meet Along The Way (Messé, Steve Curtis) - 2:04
 He Came To Meet Me (Curtis) - 4:23 
 Not California (Messé, Gary Maurer) - 4:13
 Funnel Cloud - 3:16
 Too Late To Turn Back Now (Messé, Maurer) - 3:06
 The Pills Stopped Working (Messé, Maurer) - 4:47
 Hotel Fire (Messé, Maurer) - 3:51
 Great Houses Of New York - 3:11
 Curtains - 3:03
 Old Adam - 2:39
 The Burnt-Over District - 2:33
 Reservoir (Curtis) - 3:19 
 I'll Dream Of You Tonight (Curtis) - 3:58 
 Almost Home - 2:02

Personnel
Sally Ellyson - vocals 
Dan Messé - piano, accordion, glockenspiel 
Gary Maurer - guitar, mandolin 
Steve Curtis - guitar, mandolin, banjo, back-up vocals 
George Rush - bass guitar
Mark Brotter - drums 
Bob Hoffnar - pedal steel guitar
Heather Zimmerman - violin
Greg Pliska - orchestral arrangements

References 

2006 albums
Hem (band) albums
Nettwerk Records albums